Calynda (also Calinda, Calydna, or Karynda) was a city in ancient Caria.

History
It was probably situated at the boundary of Lycia and Caria, for it is placed in the former territory by Ptolemy (xxxi, 16), in the latter by Stephanus Byzantius. Stephanus gives also another form of the name, Karynda. Calynda must be carefully distinguished from Kalydna, Kalydnos, Karyanda and Kadyanda. Strabo places it 60 stadia from the sea, west of the Gulf of Glaucus, and east of Caunus. It appears, from a passage in Herodotus, that the territory of Caunus bordered on that of Calynda. 
 
Its king, Damasithymos, was an ally of Queen Artemisia I of Caria, and was at the Battle of Artemisium and the Battle of Salamis with a ship on the side of Xerxes.

Calynda was afterwards, as it appears from Polybius, subject to Caunus; but having revolted from Caunus, it placed itself under the protection of the Rhodians.

Pliny writes its name Calydna. It is mentioned among the cities that struck coins in the Roman period.

Its site is located near Kozpınar, Asiatic Turkey.

Bishopric

The diocese is not mentioned in the Notitiae episcopatuum, but we know that it was at a certain time a suffragan of Myra, the metropolis of Lycia, for Bishop Leontius of Calynda is mentioned in 458 in the letter of the Lycian bishops to the Roman emperor Leo I about the death of Proterius of Alexandria.

No longer a residential bishopric, Calynda is today listed by the Catholic Church as a titular see.

References

Sources

Populated places in ancient Caria
Populated places in ancient Lycia
Ancient Greek archaeological sites in Turkey
Former populated places in Turkey
Catholic titular sees in Asia
History of Muğla Province